The Port of Cǎlǎrași is one of the largest Romanian river ports, located in the city of Călărași on the Danube River.

References

External links

Ports and harbours of Romania